Events from the year 1965 in Kuwait.

Incumbents
Emir: Abdullah Al-Salim Al-Sabah (until 24 November), Sabah Al-Salim Al-Sabah (starting 24 November)
Prime Minister: Sabah Al-Salim Al-Sabah (until 27 November), Jaber Al-Ahmad Al-Sabah (starting 27 November)

Events

Births

 29 May - Ali Hasan.
 9 December - Mohamed Ghaloum.

See also
Years in Jordan
Years in Syria

References

 
Kuwait
Kuwait
Years of the 20th century in Kuwait
1960s in Kuwait